Monmouth County is a county located on the northern part of the Jersey Shore in the U.S. state of New Jersey. The county is part of the New York metropolitan area. As of the 2020 United States census, the county was the state's fifth-most-populous county with a population of 643,615, its highest decennial count ever and an increase of 13,235 (+2.1%) from the 2010 census count of 630,380, which in turn reflected an increase of 15,079 from 615,301 at the 2000 census. As of 2010, the county fell to the fifth-most populous county in the state, having been surpassed by Hudson County. Monmouth County's geographic area comprises 30% water.

Monmouth's county seat is Freehold Borough. The most populous place was Middletown Township, with 67,106 residents at the time of the 2020 Census, while Howell Township covered , the largest total area of any municipality. The county is located in the Central Jersey region.

History

Etymology
The naming of Monmouth County has different historical theories. It is thought that the county received its name from the Rhode Island Monmouth Society. This is likely, due to many of the county's earliest settlers originating from Rhode Island. Another plausible theory, is from a suggestion from Colonel Lewis Morris that the county should be named after Monmouthshire in Wales, Great Britain. Other suggestions include that it was named for James Scott, 1st Duke of Monmouth (1649–1685), who had many allies among the East Jersey leadership.

Indigenous history
See also Lenape people
Around the year 1000, the area of Monmouth County began to be inhabited by the Lenape Native Americans prior to the arrival of European settlers. They came from the Mississippi River area. They lived along the vicinity of the Jersey Shore, the Raritan Bay, the Raritan River and other areas in the northeastern United States. The Lenape were a hunter-gatherer society. They were largely sedentary, changing campsites seasonally. They were prolific hunters of small game and birds. They were also skilled fisherman, and were known to harvest vast amounts of clams from the bays and inlets on the Jersey Shore. They also practiced some agriculture to augment their food supply. During this time, an important crossroad of two major Lenape trails was located in the area of Freehold in western Monmouth County.

Dutch and English colonization 
See also Monmouth Tract
In 1609, the English navigator, Henry Hudson, and his crew aboard the Dutch vessel Half Moon spotted land in what is now Monmouth County, most likely off Sandy Hook; however, some historical accounts credit this landing to present-day Keansburg.
Among the first European settlers and majority landowners in the area were Richard and Penelope Stout. Penelope "miraculously" survived her wounds from a native attack in Sandy Hook and further lived to the age of 110.  Additionally, a group of Quaker families from Long Island settled the Monmouth Tract, an early land grant from Richard Nicolls issued in 1665.  They were followed by a group of Scottish settlers who inhabited Freehold Township in about 1682–1885, followed several years later by Dutch settlers. As they arrived in this area, they were greeted by Lenape people, who lived in scattered small family bands and developed a largely amicable relationship with the new arrivals. Enslaved Africans were present in the area from at least 1680, and by 1726 made up 9% of the total population of the county.

Monmouth County was established on March 7, 1683, while part of the province of East Jersey. On October 31, 1693, the county was partitioned into the townships of Freehold, Middletown and Shrewsbury.

At the June 28, 1778, Battle of Monmouth, near Freehold Township, General George Washington's soldiers battled the British under Sir Henry Clinton, in the longest land battle of the American Revolutionary War. It was at Monmouth that the tactics and training from Friedrich Wilhelm von Steuben developed at Valley Forge during the winter encampment were first implemented on a large scale.

At independence, Monmouth's population included 1,640 slaves, as well as an undetermined number of free African Americans. The number of enslaved persons fell steeply after 1820, though a small number remained until at least 1850. Monmouth's free African American population climbed from 353 in 1790 to 2,658 in 1860.  There was a small African-American middle class consisting of freedmen present in Monmouth County by the 1840s and 1850s.

Ocean County was carved out of Monmouth County in 1850.

In 1790 Monmouth County's population was 16,918, of whom roughly 6,600 were of English descent and the remainder were Welsh, Dutch and Swedish, as well as small amounts of African Americans and Northern Irish Protestants.  By the year 2010 Monmouth County's population was 628,112 of whom 40,489 were of English descent.  Between 1890 and 1907 nearly 18 million European immigrants came to America.  At the same time the region underwent massive and not unrelated economic changes, this process led to places like Monmouth County, New Jersey becoming significantly more diverse and somewhat less rural.

Geography and climate

Much of Monmouth County remains flat and low-lying even far inland. The top portion of the hill is owned by Alcatel-Lucent and houses a research laboratory of Bell Laboratories. The northeastern portion of the county, in the Locust section of Middletown Township and the boroughs of Highlands and Atlantic Highlands, are also very hilly. The lowest point is sea level.

Along with adjacent Middlesex and Ocean counties, Monmouth County is a mecca for boating and fishing. Its waterways include several tributaries that flow from the more agrarian regions of western Monmouth County into the Raritan River, and various rivers and inlets that flow from the more densely populated region of the Raritan Bayshore of northern Monmouth County into the Raritan Bay and the Lower New York Bay, before finally draining out into the Atlantic Ocean. The Manasquan Inlet is located in the county, which connects the Atlantic Ocean with the estuary of the Manasquan River, a bay-like body of saltwater that serves as the starting point of the Intracoastal Waterway, which attracts as many as 1,600 boats each weekend during the peak season.

Climate and weather

Much of Monmouth County has a humid subtropical climate (Cfa), while some inland areas have a hot-summer humid continental climate (Dfa).

Average monthly temperatures in Asbury Park range from 32.5 °F in January to 75.0 °F in July, while in Allentown, NJ they range from 32.1 °F in January to 75.5 °F in July. 

On October 29, 2012, Hurricane Sandy caused catastrophic damage to coastal areas of Monmouth County.

Adjacent counties
 Middlesex County - northwest
 Ocean County - south
 Mercer County - west
 Burlington County - southwest
 Richmond County, New York - north
 Long Island (Kings County and Queens County, New York) - northeast

National protected areas
 Gateway National Recreation Area (part)

Demographics

2020 census
As of the 2020 census, the county had 643,615 people, 240,377 households, and 161,545 families. The county's racial makeup was 71.6% White, 6.08% African American, 0.07% Native American, 5.6% Asian, and 3.4% from two or more races. Hispanic or Latino of any race were 12.5% of the population.

Of the 240,377 households, of which 38.8% had children under the age of 18 living with them, 55.5% were married couples living together, 25.2% had a female householder with no husband present, 14.4% had a male householder with no wife present and 32.8% were non-families. 13.6% of all households were made up of individuals, and 12.7% had someone living alone who was 65 years of age or older. The average household size was 2.55 and the average family size was 3.16.

About 21.4% of the county's population was under age 18, 8.1% was from age 18 to 24, 34.8% was from age 15 to 44, and 18.2% was age 65 or older. The median age was 43.5 years. The gender makeup of the city was 48.7% male and 51.3% female. For every 100 females, there were 95.0 males.

The county's median household income was $102,870, and the median family income was $124,778. About 6.0% of the population were below the poverty line, including 9.1% of those under age 18 and 6.4% of those age 65 or over.

2010 census

Government

County government

Monmouth County is governed by a five-member Board of County Commissioners, who are elected at-large for three-year terms of office on a staggered basis, with either one or two seats up for election each year. Each January, the commissioners select one of their members to serve as the director of the board for the year to preside over the meetings and activities of the board. Monmouth County's Commissioners have both administrative and policy-making powers. The commissioners oversee the five mandatory functions of the county government delegated to it by the state. Each commissioner is assigned responsibility for one of the five functional areas: Administration and Special Services; Public Works and Engineering; Human Services, Health and Transportation; Finance and Administration of Justice, overseeing more than 70 county departments in total. In 2016, freeholders were paid $27,000 and the freeholder director was paid an annual salary of $27,900.

County Administrator Teri O'Connor, an appointed position, serves as the county's chief executive officer, and is responsible for carrying out the policies and directives established by the Board of County Commissioners and managing the daily operations of the county's more than 3,000 employees. 

, Monmouth County's Commissioners are (with terms for Chair and Vice-Chair ending every December 31st): 

The Republican Party had held all five Commissioner seats until 2006, but after the 2006 and 2008 elections, Democrats controlled the Board by a 3–2 margin. The Board swung back in favor of the Republicans after the 2009 election when Republican John Curley beat Democrat Sean Byrnes. Both were running to succeed former Commissioner Director Barbara McMorrow, a Democrat, who had chosen not to seek re-election. In 2010, former mayor of Neptune City, NJ, Thomas Arnone (R) and incumbent Commissioner Robert Clifton (R) won seats giving Republicans control of the Board of Chosen Commissioners by a 4–1 margin.

Pursuant to Article VII Section II of the New Jersey State Constitution, each county in New Jersey is required to have three elected administrative officials known as "constitutional officers." These officers are the County Clerk and County Surrogate (both elected for five-year terms of office) and the County Sheriff (elected for a three-year term).  Monmouth county's constitutional officers are:

Christopher J. Gramiccioni of Wall Township is the county's prosecutor, having been formally nominated to the position by Governor of New Jersey Chris Christie in May 2016. Gramiccioni had been serving on an acting basis for almost four years, since being appointed to the post in July 2012 by Attorney General of New Jersey Jeffrey S. Chiesa. Monmouth County constitutes Vicinage 9 of the New Jersey Superior Court and is seated at the Monmouth County Courthouse in Freehold Borough, with additional facilities in Freehold and Ocean Township; the Assignment Judge for Vicinage 9 is Lisa P. Thornton.

Federal representatives 
The 3rd, 4th, and 6th Congressional Districts cover the county.

State representatives

Fire departments 
Monmouth County is covered by 53 different fire departments, which contain 135 individual fire companies and over 7,000 volunteer firefighters, who are all represented by the Monmouth County Firemen's Association.

The Monmouth County Fire Marshal's Office is responsible for training all of the firefighters through the Monmouth County Fire Academy, as well as investigating any fires which may be deemed suspicious and/or involving a fatality. The Monmouth County fire marshal, currently Fred Migliaccio, and his staff – including assistant fire marshals and academy staff – are appointed by the County Board of Commissioners.

With the exception of the fully professional Asbury Park Fire Department and the US Navy Fire Department at NWS Earle, the remainder of the municipalities in the county have volunteer or combination fire departments. The largest volunteer department is in Middletown Township with 11 stations and 350 active members, special services, air and fire police units, in addition to operating its own training facility.

In terms of hazardous material (HazMat) emergencies, very few towns have special units to respond to these types of emergencies. Fort Monmouth responded to most HazMat cases prior to the closing of the base. Naval Weapons Station Earle is also available for HazMat incidents. Hazardous Materials incidents are currently managed by Monmouth County Hazmat as the lead agency with a joint cooperative team comprised of Neptune Township OEM, Southard (Howell) Fire Company and Middletown Fire Department Special Services.

The oldest fire department in the county in continuous operation is the Hope Fire Company in Allentown, organized in 1856. The newest fire department, Holmdel Fire Co. No. 2 was established in 2006.

Monmouth County utilizes a mutual aid system, in which surrounding municipalities are available to send their resources to incidents where extra help or expertise is needed.

Politics
Monmouth County has generally leaned moderately Republican in federal, state, and local races, though registered Republicans only outnumber registered Democrats by less than 1%. All five County Commissioners and all three constitutional officers are Republicans, and State Senator Vin Gopal is currently the only Democrat to represent any part of the county in the legislature. As of December 1, 2021, there were a total of 496,012 registered voters in Monmouth County, of whom 144,092 (29.1%) were registered as Democrats, 147,358 (29.7%) were registered as Republicans, and 198,605 (41.3%) were registered as Unaffiliated. There were 5,957 (1.2%) voters registered to other parties. Among the county's 2010 Census population, 89% of residents of age 18 and over were registered to vote.

In 2008, John McCain carried Monmouth by an unexpectedly close margin of only 3.7% margin over Barack Obama, with Obama winning New Jersey by 15.5% over McCain.  In the state's U.S. Senatorial election that same year, Dick Zimmer also won here, by a 6.2% margin over incumbent Frank Lautenberg, with Lautenberg winning reelection by 14.1% over Zimmer. In the 2016 United States presidential election, Republican Donald Trump received 166,723 (53%) of the vote, Democrat Hillary Clinton received 137,181 (43.6%) of the vote, and other candidates received 10,473 (3.3%) of the vote. In 2020, Joe Biden came closer to winning the county than any Democrat since Al Gore in 2000 and Bill Clinton in 1996, the only two Democratic presidential candidates to have won it since 1964, when Lyndon B. Johnson won a national landslide and carried every county in New Jersey.

|}

In the 2009 gubernatorial election, Republican Chris Christie received 62% of the vote, defeating Democrat Jon Corzine, who received around 31%. In the 2013 gubernatorial election, Republican Governor Chris Christie received 70.7% of the vote (123,417 votes) to Democrat Barbara Buono's 27.7% (48,477 votes). In the 2017 gubernatorial election, Republican Kim Guadagno received 101,525 (55%) of the vote, and Democrat Phil Murphy received 79,423 (43%) of the vote. Both Guadagno and Murphy were Monmouth County residents. In the 2021 gubernatorial election, Republican Jack Ciattarelli received 58.8% of the vote (141,100 ballots cast) to Democratic incumbent Phil Murphy's 40.3% (96,664 votes), thus Murphy lost his home county in both of his bids for governor.

Economy

Housing expense

In 2015, the county had a per capita personal income of $69,410, the fifth-highest in New Jersey and ranked 74th of 3,113 counties in the United States. Monmouth County ranked 38th among the highest-income counties in the United States as of 2011, placing it among the top 1.2% of counties by wealth. As of 2009, it was ranked 56th in the United States by personal per-capita income.

Gentrification

Hurricane Sandy in 2012 devastated much of the northern part of the Jersey Shore, particularly in Monmouth County. This necessitated the  demolition and rebuilding of entire neighborhoods.  Some were rebuilt to a higher economic level; this process of climate gentrification is rapidly escalating property values and transforming many communities along the Shore.  Many houses have become vacation homes for the New York financial community, akin to shoreline communities on Long Island like the Gold Coast and The Hamptons.

Telecommunications and high technology
The Bell Labs Holmdel Complex has been the site of many innovations in telecommunications and is experiencing a renaissance as a business incubator for high-tech startup companies. Today Verizon Wireless, AT&T Communications, Vonage, Avaya, and Bell Labs are located in the region.

Commerce

The county has been a commercial hub for the state and the larger northeastern United States for years. This is due to the county's location on the Jersey Shore, which attracts residents from North and South Jersey, along with the nearby states of New York, Pennsylvania, Connecticut, Delaware, and Maryland during the summer months. The region also boasts year-round attractions, such as hayrides, wine tasting, and apple picking during the autumn months. The county also features five major shopping malls:

Freehold Raceway Mall
Monmouth Mall
Pier Village
The Grove at Shrewsbury
Jersey Shore Premium Outlets

Education

Tertiary education

Monmouth University is a four-year private university located in West Long Branch that was founded in 1933 as Monmouth Junior College.

Brookdale Community College is the two-year community college for Monmouth County, one of a network of 19 county colleges statewide. The school is located in the Lincroft section of Middletown Township, having been founded in 1967.

Rutgers University has a partnership with Brookdale which offers bachelor's degree completion programs at Brookdale's Freehold campus.

K-12 education
School districts in Monmouth County include:

K-12 districts

Asbury Park Public Schools
Freehold Township Schools
Hazlet Township Public Schools
Holmdel Township Public Schools
Keansburg School District
Keyport Public Schools
Long Branch Public Schools
Manasquan Public Schools
Matawan-Aberdeen Regional School District
Middletown Township Public School District
Monmouth County Vocational School District
Neptune Township Schools
Ocean Township School District
Upper Freehold Regional School District – Regional
Wall Township Public Schools

Secondary districts

Freehold Regional High School District
Henry Hudson Regional High School
Monmouth Regional High School
Red Bank Regional High School
Rumson-Fair Haven Regional High School
Shore Regional High School – Regional

Elementary districts(K-8, except as indicated)

Atlantic Highlands School District (K-6)
Avon School District
Belmar School District
Bradley Beach School District
Brielle School District
Colts Neck School District
Deal School District
Eatontown Public Schools
Fair Haven Public Schools
Farmingdale School District
Freehold Borough Schools
Freehold Township Schools
Highlands School District (K-6)
Howell Township Public Schools
Little Silver School District
Manalapan-Englishtown Regional School District
Marlboro Township Public School District
Millstone Township Schools
Monmouth Beach School District
Oceanport School District
Red Bank Borough Public Schools
Roosevelt Public School District (K-5)
Rumson School District
Sea Girt School District
Shrewsbury Borough School District
Spring Lake School District
Spring Lake Heights School District
Tinton Falls School District – Regional
Union Beach School System
West Long Branch Public Schools

In addition to multiple public high schools, parochial schools in Monmouth County include St. Rose High School, Red Bank Catholic High School, Christian Brothers Academy, St. John Vianney High School, and Mater Dei High School, which operate under the auspices of the Roman Catholic Diocese of Trenton. A secular private school, Ranney School, is also located in the county.

The county has an extensive vocational high school program, known as the Monmouth County Vocational School District, including five magnet schools:
 Academy of Allied Health & Science (Allied) in Neptune Township
 Biotechnology High School (BioTech) in Freehold Township
 Communications High School (Communications, CHS) in Wall Township
 High Technology High School (High Tech) in Lincroft (located on the Brookdale Community College campus)
 Marine Academy of Science and Technology (MAST) in Sandy Hook

Arts and culture

 Count Basie Theatre - A landmarked performing arts center in Red Bank. The core structure opened as the "Carlton Theater" in 1926, became the "Monmouth Arts Center" in 1973, then was renamed to the "Count Basie Theatre" in 1984 to honor jazz great and Red Bank native William "Count" Basie. It  was designed by William E. Lehman and has seating capacity for 1,568 patrons.
 Two River Theater - A professional, not-for-profit, regional theater company producing plays and educational programs. The company received "Theatre of the Year" awards from the New Jersey Theatre Alliance in 2006, and from The Star-Ledger in both 2006 and 2008. At the July 2009 meeting of the New Jersey State Council on the Arts, Two River Theater was designated as a Major Impact Organization.
 Monmouth County Historical Association – Established in 1898 by a group of county residents headed by professional educator Caroline Gallup Reed, it was soon incorporated in order “to discover, procure, preserve and perpetuate whatever relates to the history of Monmouth County.” The headquarters are located in Freehold Borough in a brick Georgian-style building designed by architect J. Hallam Conover.
Monmouth County Jewish Heritage Museum - focuses on Jewish life in the county, which dates back to 1720.
 Monmouth Battlefield State Park — Located in Freehold Township and Manalapan Township, the park preserves a rural eighteenth-century landscape of orchards, fields, woods and wetlands, encompassing miles of trails for hiking and horseback riding, space for picnic areas, and four restored Revolutionary War farmhouses that were associated with the American Revolutionary War's Battle of Monmouth, including the Craig House, the  Cobb House, the Sutfin House, and the Rhea-Applegate House. The park includes a visitor center with replicas of eighteenth-century canons and other exhibits.
Gateway National Recreation Area at Sandy Hook - The barrier peninsula segment of the much larger Gateway National Recreation Area (which has other sections in Staten Island, Brooklyn, and Queens in New York) forms the other side of the "gateway" to New York Harbor. It includes two main park sites:
 Fort Hancock served as part of the harbor's coastal defense system from 1895 until 1974 and contains 100 historic buildings and fortifications.
 Sandy Hook contains seven beaches, including Gunnison Beach, a nude beach by custom, as well as salt marshes and a maritime holly forest. Ferries from Manhattan are available in season. Fishing and using hand-launched vessels are popular here.
 St. Peter's Episcopal Church — a historic Episcopal church building that was constructed in 1771, featuring Georgian and Gothic Revival elements.
Ocean Grove Camp Meeting Association District - An association founded in 1869 by a group of Methodist clergymen, led by William B. Osborn and Ellwood H. Stokes. Its mission is to "provide opportunities for spiritual birth, growth, and renewal in a Christian seaside setting." It was to operate as a summer camp meeting site on the New Jersey seashore. By the early 20th century, the popular Christian meeting ground became known as the "Queen of Religious Resorts." The community's land is still owned by the camp meeting association and leased to individual homeowners and businesses. Ocean Grove remains the longest-active camp meeting site in the United States.
 Church of the Presidents - Originally consecrated in 1879 as St. James Protestant Episcopal Chapel, a branch of St. James Episcopal Church, this former Episcopal chapel was where seven United States presidents during the Victorian era worshipped. It was visited by presidents Ulysses S. Grant, Rutherford B. Hayes, James A. Garfield, Chester A. Arthur, Benjamin Harrison, William McKinley, and Woodrow Wilson. All except Grant were in office when they paid their visits to the church.
 Seabrook–Wilson House – Nicknamed the "Spy House" by local residents, the house was built in 1663 in the town of Port Monmouth, a part of Middletown Township, making it the oldest structure in Monmouth County and one of the oldest in the state. The house's architecture was emblematic of the early English influence in the county. For most of its history, the farm on Sandy Hook Bay was home to generations of two prominent Port Monmouth families, the Seabrooks and the Wilsons. Ship owners and captains, a Revolutionary War militia officer, local business owners and investors, and a clergyman were part of these notable families, many of whom served in local government positions.
 Allaire State Park - Historic park, known for its restored 19th century ironworks, Allaire Village, which is a living history museum on the park premises. It was a prosperous industrial town producing pig iron and cast iron from the surrounding bog iron deposits. The buildings which remain and have been restored today include a general store, blacksmith shop, carpenter's shop, manager's house, foreman's house and a church. One of the workers' row house buildings has been recreated and now houses a visitor center, museum, and reenactments of nineteenth-century life in this bustling mill town. The historic village is run by a non-profit organization independent of the park and charges a nominal fee to enter the buildings. It is named after James P. Allaire, founder of the Howell Works at the same site. The park also hosts the Pine Creek Railroad, a tourist railroad.
 Holmdel Park - Located in Holmdel Township, this massive park is part of the Monmouth County Park System. The initial park land was established in 1962, with an additional  section added in 2001. The park's recreational offerings include fishing (with permit), individual and group picnic areas, tennis courts, playgrounds and 10 miles of hiking trails. Ice skating and sledding are permitted when conditions are deemed safe. The park contains four distinct visitor areas, each with its own parking; three are accessed via the main park entrance while the fourth is located at the activity center further north on Longstreet Road. The park also features:
Holmdel Arboretum - Also known as the David C. Shaw Arboretum, which contains nearly 3,000 trees and shrubs, representing hundreds of species, cultivars, and varieties, including the Jane Kluis Memorial Dwarf Conifer Garden, a collection of true cedars (Cedrus) in honor of David Rossheim, and a variety of other plantings such as weeping Atlas cedar, cherry trees, Amur cork tree, among many others. A map at the entrance identifies the major plant collections.
Longstreet Farm - A living history farm museum displaying a recreation of life in the 1890s. Workers dress in period costume, and perform the activities of a resident of the time period, such as planting and harvesting of crops, and taking caring of livestock. The Holmes-Hendrickson House, built in 1754, is a museum operated by the Monmouth County Historical Association near the farm.

Sports

Monmouth Park Racetrack in Oceanport and Freehold Raceway in Freehold offer fans of thoroughbred horse racing a chance to bet on races.

In 1943, the New York Yankees held their spring training in Asbury Park instead of Florida. This was because rail transport had to be conserved during the war, and Major League Baseball's Spring Training was limited to an area east of the Mississippi River and north of the Ohio River.

Parks and recreation 

Monmouth County parks are under the administration of the Monmouth County Park System. Established in 1960, the agency that maintains over 40 parks and recreational areas, in Monmouth County. General parks include Turkey Swamp Park, Manasquan Reservoir, Holmdel Park, Freneau Woods Park, Crosswicks Creek Park, and Seven Presidents Oceanfront Park, among many others. There are also three major bike trails (which were formerly rail-lines) in the county, the Union Transportation Trail in the southwestern section of the county (near the Delaware Valley region), the Edgar Felix Bikeway in the southeastern section of the county (near the Jersey Shore region), and the Henry Hudson Trail in the western and northern sections of the county (near the Raritan Bayshore and Raritan Valley regions).

The county also has two major state parks, Monmouth Battlefield State Park and Allaire State Park, along with a section of the Gateway National Recreation Area at the Sandy Hook Unit.

National protected area
 Gateway National Recreation Area (part)

Wineries, breweries, and distilleries
The county is home to several wineries, including:
 Basil T's Brewery
 Carton Brewing
 Cream Ridge Winery
 Four JG's Orchards & Vineyards
 Kane Brewing
 Laird & Company
 Peppadew Fresh Vineyards

Other points of interest
 Keansburg Amusement Park & Runaway Rapids
 PNC Bank Arts Center
 Pier Village
 Asbury Park Boardwalk
 Freehold Raceway Mall
 Monmouth Mall
 iPlay America
 Numerous beaches along the Jersey Shore
Monmouth Executive Airport
 Holmdel Cemetery & Mausoleum

Municipalities

The 53 municipalities in Monmouth County (with 2010 Census data for housing units and area in square miles, as well as 2018 estimates for population) are listed below. Other, unincorporated communities in the county are listed next to their parent municipality. Many of these areas are census-designated places (labeled as CDPs) that have been created by the United States Census Bureau for enumeration purposes within a township, with the 2010 Census population listed. Other communities and enclaves that exist within a municipality are also listed.

Coroners and medical examiners
Jordan Woolley served as coroner circa 1880. John W. Flock Sr. was the coroner in 1902. The office of medical examiner was merged with Middlesex County, New Jersey in 2016. Dr. Diane Karluk is the medical examiner serving Mercer County, Middlesex County and Monmouth County.

Monmouth County SPCA
The Monmouth County Society for the Prevention of Cruelty to Animals is an animal welfare organization in Eatontown providing animal sheltering and cruelty investigation services to Monmouth County, New Jersey. It was founded in 1945 to care for the community's homeless, neglected and abused animals. It is a private, not-for-profit s. 501(c)3 organization. In 1999, the organization made the decision to become a no-kill shelter. The organization remains open-admission for communities it serves, taking owner surrenders by appointment and also offers animals for adoption. Its Humane Law Enforcement Division investigates more than 900 animal cruelty complaints every year, and accepts anonymous calls. The SPCA also provides dog obedience training, a spay/neutering clinic and pet bereavement counselling.

Transportation

Roads and highways

The state routes include Route 18, Route 33, Route 33 Business, Route 34, Route 35, Route 36, Route 66, Route 70, Route 71, Route 79, and Route 138.

The New Jersey Turnpike (Interstate 95) just misses the county border by  near Upper Freehold Township. The Garden State Parkway extends  from Brick Township in Ocean County in the south to Old Bridge Township in Middlesex County to the north. The Parkway's Monmouth Service Area is located at milepost 100, between exits 98 and 100.

Public transportation

Numerous NJ Transit buses crisscross and deliver hundreds of passengers each day to northern New Jersey and New York's Port Authority Bus Terminal in Midtown Manhattan as well as the 317 bus line going into Philadelphia. Many hundreds more each day travel on NJ Transit Rail Operations' North Jersey Coast Line, which serves Penn Station in New York City, and passes through Middlesex County, entering Monmouth County at Matawan, with 14 stations covering the length of the county, connecting the New York region to Atlantic Ocean shore communities.

See also

 USS Monmouth County (LST-1032)
 Monmouth County Historical Association
 Monmouth Conservation Foundation
 National Register of Historic Places listings in Monmouth County, New Jersey
 List of Monmouth County Board of County Commissioner Directors

References

Further reading
 Graham Russell Hodges, Slavery and Freedom in the Rural North: African Americans in Monmouth County, New Jersey, 1665-1865 Madison, WI: Madison House, 1997
 Charles A. Philhower, Indians of Monmouth County, New Jersey. (1924) Morristown, NJ: Digital Antiquaria, 2006.
 Edwin Salter, A History of Monmouth and Ocean Counties Embracing a Genealogical Record of Earliest Settlers of Monmouth and Ocean Counties and Their Descendants; The Indians: Their Language, Manners, and Customs; Important Historical Events: The Revolutionary War, Battle of Monmouth, The War of the Rebellion: Names of Officers and Men of Monmouth and Ocean Counties Engaged in It, etc., etc. Bayonne, NJ: E. Gardner and Son, 1890.
 Charles A. Philhower, Indians of Monmouth County, New Jersey. (1924) Morristown, NJ: Digital Antiquaria, 2006.

External links

 Monmouth County official website
 Monmouth County map, New Jersey

 
1683 establishments in New Jersey
Central Jersey
Counties in the New York metropolitan area
Jersey Shore
Geography of the Pine Barrens (New Jersey)
Populated places established in 1683